The 2019 Akwa Ibom State gubernatorial election occurred on March 10, 2019. Incumbent PDP Governor Udom Gabriel Emmanuel won re-election for a second term, defeating Nsima Ekere of the APC.

Udom Gabriel Emmanuel won the primary election after he was returned as the sole candidate. He picked Moses Ekpo as his running mate. Nsima Ekere was the APC candidate with Amadu Jackson Attai as his running mate. 45 candidates contested in the election.

Electoral system
The Governor of Akwa Ibom State is elected using the plurality voting system.

Primary election

PDP primary
Udom Gabriel Emmanuel won the primary election after he was returned as the sole candidate. He picked Amadu Jackson Attai as his running mate.

APC primary
The APC primary election was held on September 30, 2018. Nsima Ekere won the primary election polling 160,458 votes against 3 other candidates. His closest rival was Dan Abia who came second with 4,189 votes, Akpanudoedehe came third with 2,015 votes, while  Edet Efretuei had 1,234 votes.

Results
A total number of 45 candidates registered with the Independent National Electoral Commission to contest in the election.

The total number of registered voters in the state was 2,119,727, while 720,064 voters were accredited. Total number of votes cast was 712,037, while number of valid votes was 696,245. Rejected votes were 15,792.

By local government area
Here are the results of the election by local government area for the two major parties. The total valid votes of 696,245 represents the 45 political parties that participated in the election. Green represents LGAs won by Udom Gabriel Emmanuel. Blue represents LGAs won by Nsima Ekere.

References 

Akwa Ibom State gubernatorial election
Akwa Ibom State gubernatorial election
Akwa Ibom State gubernatorial elections
2019 Akwa Ibom State elections